Gabriela Antonia García Segura (born 2 April 1997) is a Venezuelan professional footballer who plays as a forward for Spanish club Real Sociedad and the Venezuela national team.

Career
Born in Tunapuy, Gaby excelled at handball, basketball and football as a youth. After a strong showing at a Sucre Department football tournament in 2007, she joined the Venezuela youth national team setup.

Gaby joined Deportivo de La Coruña in 2017. Over four seasons she helped Deportivo gain promotion to Liga F, and became the first player to appear in 100 competitive matches for the club. Gaby scored 31 goals during the 2018–19 Segunda División season, securing promotion for Deportivo.

Gaby led Real Sociedad Femenino to the 2022–23 Supercopa de España Femenina final, where she suffered a serious leg injury.

International goals

References

External links 
 
Profile at Real Sociedad

1997 births
Living people
Women's association football forwards
Venezuelan women's footballers
People from Sucre (state)
Venezuela women's international footballers
Competitors at the 2014 Central American and Caribbean Games
Deportivo de La Coruña (women) players
Venezuelan expatriate women's footballers
Venezuelan expatriate sportspeople in Spain
Expatriate women's footballers in Spain
Real Sociedad (women) players
Primera División (women) players